Andrew Christopher West (born 31 March 1960) is an English Sinologist. His first works concerned Chinese novels of the Ming and Qing dynasties.  His study of Romance of the Three Kingdoms used a new approach to analyse the relationship among the various versions, extrapolating the original text of that novel.

West compiled a catalogue for the Chinese-language library of the English missionary Robert Morrison containing 893 books representing in total some 10,000 string-bound fascicules.

His subsequent work is in the minority languages of China, especially Khitan, Manchu, and Mongolian. He proposed an encoding scheme for the 'Phags-pa script, which was subsequently included in Unicode version 5.0.

West has also worked to encode gaming symbols and phonetic characters to the UCS, and has been working on encodings for Tangut and Jurchen.

Works 
 1996. Sānguó yǎnyì bǎnběn kǎo 三國演義版本考 [A study of the editions of Romance of the Three Kingdoms]. Shanghai: Shanghai Classics Publishing House. 
 1998. Catalogue of the Morrison Collection of Chinese Books (馬禮遜藏書書目). London: SOAS. 
 2012. "Musical Notation for Flute in Tangut Manuscripts". In Irina Fedorovna Popova (ed.), Тангуты в Центральной Азии: сборник статей в честь 80-летия проф. Е.И.Кычанова [Tanguts in Central Asia: a collection of articles marking the 80th anniversary of Prof. E. I. Kychanov pp. 443–453. Moscow: Oriental Literature. 
2016. Gerard Clauson's Skeleton Tangut (Hsi Hsia) Dictionary: A facsimile edition. With an introduction by Imre Galambos. With Editorial notes and an Index by Andrew West. Prepared for publication by Michael Everson. Portlaoise: Evertype. .

Software
West is the developer of a number of software products and fonts for Microsoft Windows, including BabelPad and BabelMap.

BabelPad
BabelPad is a Unicode text editor with various tools for entering characters and performing text conversions such as normalization and Unicode casing. BabelPad also supports a wide range of encodings, and has input methods for entering Chinese, Mongolian, Manchu, Tibetan, Uyghur and Yi text, as well as for entering individual Unicode characters by their hexadecimal code point value.

BabelMap
BabelMap is a Unicode character map application that supports all Unicode blocks and characters, and includes various utilities such as pinyin and radical lookup tools for entering Chinese characters.

References

External links 
 

British sinologists
1960 births
People educated at Bishop Vesey's Grammar School
Living people
People involved with Unicode
Tangutologists